Dervilla Mitchell Honorary CBE, FREng, FIEI is an Irish engineer and a director and joint deputy chair of Arup Group. She led the management of the design for London Heathrow Airport's Terminal 5, and as of 2019 was project director for Arup for a 2-billion dollar airport terminal development in Abu Dhabi.  She is a Fellow of two national engineering academies, and the holder of an honorary CBE.

Early life and education
Mitchell grew up in Dublin, Ireland. Her father Thomas Austin was an architect, and her grandfather Tony Woods and three of her uncles were engineers. She gained a degree in Civil Engineering from University College Dublin in 1980, and later a Diploma in Project Management from Trinity College Dublin.

Career
Mitchell joined Arup Group in Dublin after graduating. She moved to Massachusetts in 1984 to work with Weidlinger Associates and then returned to Arup's London office in 1986. She has worked on projects including Portcullis House at Westminster, Action Stations for the Portsmouth Historic Dockyard, the London 2012 Olympic Village, and Heathrow Terminal 5 where she was Head of Design Management for the project. Mitchell joined the board of Arup in 2014 and was then described as "the most senior female in the business". In 2017 she became Chair of Arup's UK, India, Middle East and Africa (UKIMEA) Region, and in 2021 joint deputy chair of Arup Group.

Recognition
Mitchell is a Fellow of the Royal Academy of Engineering, a Fellow of the Institution of Engineers of Ireland, and a Fellow of the Irish Academy of Engineering. In 2014 she was appointed an honorary CBE (honorary because she is not a British or Commonwealth citizen). In 2016 University College Dublin awarded her an honorary Doctorate of Science. In 2020 she was awarded the RAEng President's medal.

Personal life
Mitchell is married and has three children, has been a local school governor, and enjoys cycling.

References

Year of birth missing (living people)
Living people
Honorary Commanders of the Order of the British Empire
Fellows of the Royal Academy of Engineering
Female Fellows of the Royal Academy of Engineering
Irish women engineers
Ove Arup
Alumni of University College Dublin
Alumni of Trinity College Dublin
Engineers from Dublin (city)